Maurice Flynn (24 March 1869 – 25 July 1936) was an Irish hurler who played as a left wing-forward for the Limerick senior team.

Born in Kilfinane, County Limerick, Flynn first played competitive hurling in his youth. He was a regular for the Limerick senior hurling team during a successful period at the end of the 19th century. During his inter-county career he won one All-Ireland medal and one Munster medal.

At club level Flood was a two-time championship medallist with Kilfinane.

Honours

Player

Limerick
All-Ireland Senior Hurling Championship (1): 1897
Munster Senior Hurling Championship (1): 1897

References

1869 births
1936 deaths
Kilfinane hurlers
Limerick inter-county hurlers
All-Ireland Senior Hurling Championship winners